This is a list of women who have been sat as members of the House of Lords of the United Kingdom. Unless stated otherwise the reason for leaving the Lords is death.

List of members

References

See also 

 Women in the House of Commons of the United Kingdom
 Women in the House of Lords
 List of members of the House of Lords
 List of female members of the House of Commons of the United Kingdom

Members of the British House of Lords
Women in England
Lists of women legislators in the United Kingdom
British women in politics
Lists of politicians from the United Kingdom
Lists of women politicians in the United Kingdom